Sano is a Japanese surname. Notable people with the surname include:

 Fusako Sano, Japanese kidnapping victim
 Gaku Sano, (born 1992), Japanese actor
 Hayato Sano (born 1998) Japanese actor, and idol from M!LK
 Hidemasa Sano (born 1984), Japanese swimmer
 Hinako Sano (born 1994), Japanese actress
 Hiroyuki Sano, Japanese pole vaulter
 Junya Sano (born 1982), Japanese cyclist
 , Japanese footballer
 Kazuhiro Sano (born 1956), Japanese film director
 Kazuma Sano (born 1989), Japanese actor
 Keita Sano (born 1994), Japanese baseball player
 , Japanese basketball coach
 Konosuke Sano, Japanese long-distance runner
 Mari Sano (born 1968), Japanese artist
 , Japanese samurai
 Masayuki Sano (born 1919), Japanese fencer
 Miguel Angel Sano, Dominican baseball player
 Minoru Sano (figure skater) (born 1955), Japanese figure skater
 Minoru Sano (chef) (1951–2014), Japanese chef
 Mizuki Sano (born 1973), Japanese actor
 Motoharu Sano (born 1956), Japanese musician
 Naoki Sano, Japanese wrestler
 Natsume Sano (born 1985), Japanese actress 
 Nobuyoshi Sano (born 1969), Japanese musician
 Rihei Sano (1912-1992), Japanese footballer
 Roy I. Sano (born 1931), Japanese-American bishop
 Seki Sano (1905-1966) was a Japanese actor
 Shirō Sano (born 1955), Japanese actor
 Tadayoshi Sano (1889-1945), Japanese army officer
 Tomoaki Sano (born 1968), Japanese footballer
 Tony Sano, Japanese-American TV host
 Toru Sano (born 1963), Japanese footballer
 Tsubasa Sano (born 1994), Japanese footballer
 Tsuneha Sano (1871–1956), Japanese scout
 Tsunetami Sano (1822–1902), Japanese statesman
 Yōko Sano (1938-2010), Japanese writer
 Toshikazu Sano (1940-2000), Japanese football referee
 Yoshimune Sano (born 1979), Japanese basketball player
 Yuko Sano (born 1979), Japanese volleyball player
 Yumeka Sano (born 1985), Japanese sprinter
 Yuya Sano (born 1982), Japanese footballer

References

Japanese-language surnames